Ophiolechia pertinens is a moth in the family Gelechiidae. It was described by Edward Meyrick in 1931. It is found in Paraguay.

References

Ophiolechia
Taxa named by Klaus Sattler
Moths described in 1931